Abdul Razak Nuhu (born 14 May 1991) is a Ghanaian international footballer who most recently played professionally as a left back .

Club career
Nuhu signed for English side Manchester City in February 2011. He was immediately loaned to Norwegian club Strømsgodset, where he made his professional debut.
Nuhu moved again on a six-month loan to the Cypriot Club Apollon Limassol on 30 January 2014. On 24 June 2014, Nuhu signed a three-year contract with Anorthosis Famagusta. On June 3, 2016, Nuhu was released by Anorthosis after a two-year spell with the Cypriot side.

On 10 March 2017, Nuhu joined Norwegian side Fredrikstad.

On July 10, 2018, Al-Washm has signed Ghanaian defender Razak Nuhu for on seasons by buying the player's card from Fredrikstad represent Al-Washm from the new season of the Prince Mohammad bin Salman League . On July 10, Yao was appointed by the Al-Washm.

International career
Nuhu made his senior international debut for Ghana in 2012.

Personal
Razak is the older brother of  footballer Rashid Nuhu.

Career statistics

References

External links

1991 births
Living people
Ghanaian footballers
Ghana international footballers
Right to Dream Academy players
Manchester City F.C. players
Strømsgodset Toppfotball players
AEL Limassol players
Anorthosis Famagusta F.C. players
Fredrikstad FK players
Eliteserien players
Al-Washm Club players
Norwegian First Division players
Cypriot First Division players
Saudi First Division League players
Ghanaian expatriate footballers
Ghanaian expatriate sportspeople in England
Expatriate footballers in England
Ghanaian expatriate sportspeople in Norway
Expatriate footballers in Norway
Ghanaian expatriate sportspeople in Cyprus
Expatriate footballers in Cyprus
Ghanaian expatriate sportspeople in Saudi Arabia
Expatriate footballers in Saudi Arabia
Association football fullbacks
People from Tamale, Ghana